Robbie Fradd (born 4 December 1964 in South Africa) is a jockey in Thoroughbred horse racing.

Robbie Fradd, has ridden in his native South Africa and in Mauritius, Australia, New Zealand, Dubai, Japan, Singapore and Hong Kong. He was the champion jockey and second-placed rider for the 1999–2000 and 2000–2001 Hong Kong racing seasons respectively.

Fradd relocated his family to Australia in 2014 for lifestyle reasons, settling on the Gold Coast and obtaining a license to ride. He currently rides primarily in southern Queensland.

References

 Robbie Fradd profile at Jockeysroom.com

1964 births
Living people
South African jockeys
Hong Kong jockeys